Pycnochromis retrofasciatus,  the black-bar chromis, is a Chromis from the Western Pacific Ocean. It occasionally makes its way into the aquarium trade. It grows to a size of 4 cm in length.

References

External links
 

retrofasciata
Fish described in 1913